Sean Pangelinan (born March 11, 1987) is a Guamanian sprint canoer who competed in the late 2000s. At the 2008 Summer Olympics in Beijing, he was eliminated in the semifinals of the C-1 500 m event and the heats of the C-1 1000 m event.

References
Sports-Reference.com profile

External links
 

1987 births
Canoeists at the 2008 Summer Olympics
Guamanian male canoeists
Living people
Olympic canoeists of Guam